Algorithms and Combinatorics is a book series in mathematics, and particularly in combinatorics and the design and analysis of algorithms. It is published by Springer Science+Business Media, and was founded in 1987.

Books
, the books published in this series include:
The Simplex Method: A Probabilistic Analysis (Karl Heinz Borgwardt, 1987, vol. 1)
Geometric Algorithms and Combinatorial Optimization (Martin Grötschel, László Lovász, and Alexander Schrijver, 1988, vol. 2; 2nd ed., 1993)
Systems Analysis by Graphs and Matroids (Kazuo Murota, 1987, vol. 3)
Greedoids (Bernhard Korte, László Lovász, and Rainer Schrader, 1991, vol. 4)
Mathematics of Ramsey Theory (Jaroslav Nešetřil and Vojtěch Rödl, eds., 1990, vol. 5)
Matroid Theory and its Applications in Electric Network Theory and in Statics (Andras Recszki, 1989, vol. 6)
Irregularities of Partitions: Papers from the meeting held in Fertőd, July 7–11, 1986 (Gábor Halász and Vera T. Sós, eds., 1989, vol. 8)
Paths, Flows, and VLSI-Layout: Papers from the meeting held at the University of Bonn, Bonn, June 20–July 1, 1988 (Bernhard Korte, László Lovász, Hans Jürgen Prömel, and Alexander Schrijver, eds., 1990, vol. 9)
New Trends in Discrete and Computational Geometry (János Pach, ed., 1993, vol. 10)
Linear Optimization and Extensions (Manfred Padberg, 1999, vol. 12)
The Mathematics of Paul Erdös I (Ronald Graham and Jaroslav Nešetřil, eds., 1997, vol. 13)
The Mathematics of Paul Erdös II (Ronald Graham and Jaroslav Nešetřil, eds., 1997, vol. 14)
Geometry of Cuts and Metrics (Michel Deza and Monique Laurent, 1997, vol. 15)
Probabilistic Methods for Algorithmic Discrete Mathematics (M. Habib, C. McDiarmid, J. Ramirez-Alfonsin, and B. Reed, 1998, vol. 16)
Modern Cryptography, Probabilistic Proofs and Pseudorandomness (Oded Goldreich, 1999, vol. 17)
Geometric Discrepancy: An Illustrated Guide (Jiří Matoušek, 1999, vol. 18)
Applied Finite Group Actions (Adalbert Kerber, 1999, vol. 19)
Matrices and Matroids for Systems Analysis (Kazuo Murota, 2000, vol. 20; corrected ed., 2010)
Combinatorial Optimization (Bernhard Korte and Jens Vygen, 2000, vol. 21; 5th ed., 2012)
The Strange Logic of Random Graphs (Joel Spencer, 2001, vol. 22)
Graph Colouring and the Probabilistic Method (Michael Molloy and Bruce Reed, 2002, Vol. 23)
Combinatorial Optimization: Polyhedra and Efficiency (Alexander Schrijver, 2003, vol. 24. In three volumes: A. Paths, flows, matchings; B. Matroids, trees, stable sets; C. Disjoint paths, hypergraphs)
Discrete and Computational Geometry: The Goodman-Pollack Festschrift (B. Aronov, S. Basu, J. Pach, and M. Sharir, eds., 2003, vol. 25)
Topics in Discrete Mathematics: Dedicated to Jarik Nešetril on the Occasion of his 60th birthday (M. Klazar, J. Kratochvíl, M. Loebl, J. Matoušek, R. Thomas, and P. Valtr, eds., 2006, vol. 26)
Boolean Function Complexity: Advances and Frontiers (Stasys Jukna, 2012, Vol. 27)
Sparsity: Graphs, Structures, and Algorithms (Jaroslav Nešetřil and Patrice Ossona de Mendez, 2012, vol. 28)
Optimal Interconnection Trees in the Plane (Marcus Brazil and Martin Zachariasen, 2015, vol. 29)
Combinatorics and Complexity of Partition Functions (Alexander Barvinok, 2016, vol. 30)

References

Publications established in 1987
Series of mathematics books
Springer Science+Business Media books
Algorithms
Combinatorics